Walter Norman "Wal" Ives (10 November 1906 – c. 1983) was a rugby union player who represented Australia.

Ives, a lock, was born in Sydney and claimed a total of 5 international rugby caps for Australia.

References

Australian rugby union players
Australia international rugby union players
People educated at Sydney Grammar School
1906 births
1983 deaths
Rugby union players from Sydney
Rugby union locks